Dino Drpić (born 26 May 1981) is a Croatian professional footballer who last played for Savski Marof. A product of Dinamo Zagreb Academy, Drpić turned professional in 2000 and went on to spend nine years with the club.

Club career
Drpić rose through the youth ranks of Dinamo and became a consistent performer in the first squad. He debuted for the first team in a UEFA Champions League qualifiers return match at A.C. Milan on 9 August 2000, and was one of the key figures in Dinamo's squad in the upcoming seasons. Dinamo loaned Dino to Karlsruher SC in 2008–09 winter transfer window following a scandal in which it was revealed that he and his Playboy model wife Nives Celzijus had sex on the grass at Dinamo's ground. He was signed permanently during the season and was released on 22 April 2010. After Karlsruhe, Drpić had brief spells with AEK Athens in Greece and Volyn Lutsk in Ukraine before returning to Croatia in March 2012, signing for HNK Rijeka.

In January 2013, he signed with Brunei DPMM FC as one of their foreign players for the 2013 S.League season.

In April 2013, DPMM FC terminated Drpić's contract. He went back to Croatia in search of new club.

International career 
After winning almost 30 caps as a Croatian youth international and having participated in the 2004 UEFA European Under-21 Football Championship, Drpić received his first call-up to represent the country as a full international in 2007. He made his debut for Croatia on 16 October 2007 in a friendly match against Slovakia, but did not feature in any of the team's qualifying matches for the UEFA Euro 2008. In the end, it remains his only full international appearance.

Personal life
Drpić was married to Playboy model and singer Nives Celzijus, with whom he has children Taiša and Leone. They divorced in 2014.

While on holiday in Krk in the summer of 2008, a British couple tried to kidnap their son Leone after mistaking him for Madeleine McCann.

Career statistics

Honours
Croatian First League: 2002–03, 2005–06, 2006–07, 2007–08
Croatian Cup: 2003–04, 2006–07, 2007–08

Play Boy Thopy 2009

References

External links
 

1981 births
Living people
Footballers from Zagreb
Association football defenders
Croatian footballers
Croatia youth international footballers
Croatia under-21 international footballers
Croatia international footballers
GNK Dinamo Zagreb players
Karlsruher SC players
AEK Athens F.C. players
FC Volyn Lutsk players
HNK Rijeka players
DPMM FC players
NK Kustošija players
Croatian expatriate footballers
Croatian Football League players
Bundesliga players
2. Bundesliga players
Super League Greece players
Ukrainian Premier League players
Expatriate footballers in Germany
Croatian expatriate sportspeople in Germany
Expatriate footballers in Greece
Croatian expatriate sportspeople in Greece
Expatriate footballers in Ukraine
Croatian expatriate sportspeople in Ukraine
Expatriate footballers in Brunei
Croatian expatriate sportspeople in Brunei